Tunica interior, subucula, or colobium, were undergarments worn during Ancient Roman times. fascia, a sort of corset, then a tunica interior (subucula, interula), and above it the indusium, or tunica indusiata. From 753 until 323 B.C. it was the innermost tunic (undergarment). They were made of wool and later silk or cotton and the width was consistent from top to bottom

References

Roman-era clothing
Undergarments